Tykhon Zhylyakov (9 July 1968 – 18 February 2011) was the Eastern Orthodox bishop of Kremenchuk and Lubny, Ukraine, of the Ukrainian Orthodox Church.

He died on 18 February 2011 at the age of 42.

Notes

Ukrainian Orthodox bishops
1968 births
2011 deaths